Tjejmilen is a girls-women only, cross-country running event in Stockholm, Sweden. Hosted by Hässelby SK and Spårvägen FK, it is run across a 10 kilometers long course on Djurgården.

Being annual, the first event was held on 19 August 1984. It often gathers thousands of participants.

Winners
1984 – Evy Palm, Sweden, 34:21
1985 – Evy Palm, Sweden, 34:28
1986 – Evy Palm, Sweden, 33:29
1987 – Malin Wästlund, Sweden, 34:20
1988 – Evy Palm, Sweden, 34:09
1989 – Evy Palm, Sweden, 34:09
1990 – Grete Waitz, Norway, 33:49
1991 – Midde Hamrin, Sweden, 34:34
1992 – Sara Romé, Sweden, 35:14
1993 – Gunhild Halle, Norway, 34:25
1994 – Sara Romé, Sweden, 34:35
1995 – Grete Kirkeberg, Norway, 34:50
1996 – Ingmarie Nilsson, Sweden, 35,32
1997 – Grete Kirkeberg, Norway, 35:16
1998 – Marie Söderström-Lundberg, Sweden, 34:37
1999 – Susanne Johansson, Sweden, 36:04
2000 – Marie Söderström-Lundberg, Sweden, 33:29
2001 – Lena Gavelin, Sweden, 33:35
2002 – Janet Ongera, Kenya, 33:22
2003 – Kirsi Valasti, Finland, 33:16
2004 – Lena Gavelin, Sweden, 34:44
2005 – Lisa Blommé, Sweden, 34:45
2006 – Ida Nilsson, Sweden, 34:12
2007 – Isabellah Andersson, Sweden, 34:50
2008 – Lisa Blommé, Sweden, 33:58
2009 – Isabellah Andersson, Sweden, 33:49
2010 – Isabellah Andersson, Sweden, 33:38
2011 – Isabellah Andersson, Sweden, 33:25
2012 – Karoline Bjerkeli Grøvdal, Norway 33.14
2013 – Isabellah Andersson, Sweden, 33:42
2014 – Meraf Bahta, Sweden, 32:40
2015 – Webalem Ayele, Ethiopia, 33:28
2016 – Fantu Tekla, Ethiopia, 32:40
2017 – Sara Holmgren, Sweden 34.52
2018 – Ayantu Eshete, Ethiopia, 35:06
2019 – Hanna Lindholm, Sweden, 35:06
2020 – Cancelled because of the Corona pandemic
2021 – Meraf Bahta, Sweden, 32.41
2022 – Carolina Wikström, Sweden, 33.51

See also
Tjejtrampet
Tjejvasan

References

External links

official website

1984 establishments in Sweden
Athletics competitions in Sweden
Cross country running competitions
Recurring sporting events established in 1984
September sporting events
Women's sports competitions in Sweden
Cross country running in Sweden
Annual sporting events in Sweden
Autumn events in Sweden